"Back to the Start" is a track on Lily Allen's second studio album, It's Not Me, It's You. It was released as a promotional single from the album, and also as a 7" vinyl record with one of Allen's previously-released songs as a B-side, "Kabul Shit".

"Back to the Start" was played in nightly radio countdowns in Australia and peaked at #21 on the Australian Airplay Chart. There is no music video for the song.

Record Store Day
Lily Allen was one of twelve acts on the Parlophone label to have an exclusive record released for UK Record Store Day 2010. The song chosen was "Back to the Start", with previous B-side "Kabul Shit" featuring again as the b-side to the single. It was released on a 7" vinyl only format, limited to 1,000 copies and was only available from selected independent music stores across the UK on 17 April 2010. The song could also be cherry-picked from the regular album download.

Background
Lyrically, the song is an apology to Allen's older half-sister Sarah Owen, who she didn't get along with when they were teenagers. During a track by track interview for It's Not Me, It's You, Allen stated "We had a rocky relationship for years and years and years and it was just getting to the point where we just couldn't argue like teenagers anymore, so I played it to her a long time ago and it's kinda worked, we've sorted a lot of things out".

Allen plays a glockenspiel solo in the bridge of the song.

Track listing
 Limited Edition 7" Vinyl
"Back to the Start" – 4:14
"Kabul Shit" – 3:45

Charts

References

2010 singles
Lily Allen songs
Record Store Day releases
2009 songs
Songs written by Greg Kurstin
Songs written by Lily Allen
Song recordings produced by Greg Kurstin